Arthur James Cochran Wilson, FRS (28 November 1914 – 1 July 1995) was a Canadian-British crystallographer known for his work on the statistical aspects of X-ray crystallography.

Education and career
He was born in Springhill, Nova Scotia. He was educated at King's Collegiate School, Windsor, Nova Scotia and Dalhousie University, Halifax, Nova Scotia where he was awarded a BSc in 1934 and an MSc in 1936. He then proceeded to the Massachusetts Institute of Technology, where he received his first PhD in 1938 on the anomalous thermal behaviour of the ferro-electric Rochelle salt.

Awarded an 1851 Exhibition Scholarship in 1937, he left MIT for St John's College, Cambridge and the Cavendish Laboratory in 1938. There he made accurate measurements of the thermal expansion of aluminium and lead and gained a second PhD in 1942, acquiring a lifelong interest in X-ray crystallography in the process. His interest was particularly stimulated by a research paper he was asked to review on deriving absolute from relative intensities of X-ray diffraction data which made him aware of the analytic power of crystallographic statistics. His book X-ray Optics, first published in 1949, is still a definitive work on the subject.

He left Cambridge in 1945 to be a lecturer in the Department of Physics at University College, Cardiff becoming in 1954 Professor of Physics and Director of the Viriamu Jones Laboratory, a post he held until 1965. There he founded a school of organic crystal chemistry which achieved world-wide recognition for its work on alkaloids and other organic substances. In the late 1940s he demonstrated that the symmetry elements of a crystal structure can be deduced from observed diffraction data.

The introduction of commercial X-ray powder diffractometers about 1950 led to his further contributions to X-ray diffraction being published in 1963 in the Mathematical Theory of X-ray Powder Diffraction. Together with H. S. Peiser and H. P. Rooksby, he was editor of X-ray Diffraction by Polycrystalline Materials, first published in 1955. He also co-authored X-ray Diffraction in 1974. He was also active in the editorial field, as Editor of Acta Crystallographica from 1960 to 1977 and Associate Editor of the Proceedings of the Royal Society from 1978 to 1983.

In 1965 he was appointed Professor of Crystallography in the Department of Physics at University of Birmingham, where he continued to pursue his research interests and editorial activities. Shortly before his retirement in 1982, he was involved in the formation of the British Crystallographic Association. After retirement he returned to Cambridge to chair the International Union of Crystallography's Commission on International (Crystallographic) Tables, which were in need of updating. He died in Cambridge on 1 July 1995.

Honors and awards
Wilson was elected a Fellow of the Royal Society in 1963. He was Vice-President of the International Union of Crystallography between l978 and 1981. He received the Distinguished Fellow Award from the International Centre for Diffraction Data in 1984. He was awarded a honorary doctor degree from Dalhousie University in 1991.

Personal life
Wilson had married Harriett Friedeberg in 1946; they had two sons and a daughter.

References

1914 births
1995 deaths
Fellows of the Royal Society
Academics of the University of Birmingham
People from Cumberland County, Nova Scotia
Massachusetts Institute of Technology alumni
Alumni of St John's College, Cambridge
Alumni of the University of Cambridge
Canadian crystallographers
British crystallographers